Natalicio Talavera is a town in the Guairá Department of Paraguay. The town is named after 19th-century poet Natalicio Talavera. The Tebicuarymí River runs near the town.

Sources 
World Gazeteer: Paraguay – World-Gazetteer.com

References 
 

Populated places in the Guairá Department